Sears Isle Nuclear Power Plant was a nuclear power plant proposed by Central Maine Power in 1974 as a single 1,150 MW nuclear reactor built by Westinghouse.  It was to be built on Sears Island in Maine, but the project was canceled in 1977.

See also

Nuclear power debate
List of canceled nuclear plants in the United States

References

Cancelled nuclear power stations in the United States
Buildings and structures in Waldo County, Maine